
Gmina Kobylnica is a rural gmina (administrative district) in Słupsk County, Pomeranian Voivodeship, in northern Poland.

The gmina contains part of the protected area called Słupia Valley Landscape Park.

Villages
Gmina Kobylnica contains the villages and settlements of Bolesławice, Bolesławice-Kolonia, Bzowo, Ciechomice, Dobrzęcino, Giełdoń, Kczewo, Kobylnica, Kobylniczka, Komiłowo, Komorczyn, Kończewo, Kozłówek, Kruszyna, Kuleszewo, Kwakowo, Łosino, Lubuń, Luleminko, Lulemino, Maszkowo, Miedzno, Otok, Płaszewo, Reblinko, Reblino, Rozłęka, Runowo Sławieńskie, Runowo-Kolonia, Ściegnica, Sierakowo Słupskie, Sierakowo-Kolonia, Słonowice, Słonowiczki, Sycewice, Widzino, Wrząca, Wrząckie, Zagórki, Zajączkowo, Zbyszewo, Zębowo, Zębowo-Kolonia, Żelki, Żelkowiec and Żelkówko.

Neighbouring gminas
Gmina Kobylnica is bordered by the city of Słupsk and by the gminas of Dębnica Kaszubska, Kępice, Postomino, Sławno, Słupsk and Trzebielino.

References
 Central Statistical Office (Poland):  Population. Size and structure of population and vital statistics in Poland by territorial division. As of Dec. 31, 2014

Kobylnica
Słupsk County

de:Kobylnica#Gmina Kobylnica